The Legislature XVIII of Italy started on 23 March 2018 and ended on 12 October 2022. The composition of the Chamber of Deputies and of the Senate is the one resulting from the 4 March 2018 election, called after the dissolution of the Parliament announced by President Sergio Mattarella on 28 December 2017.

The members of this legislature have on average the lowest age in the history of the Italian Republic: 44 years old in the Chamber of Deputies and 52 in the Senate. This legislature has also the largest number of new MPs and the highest percentage of women (34%) in Italian history.

Government

Composition

Chamber of Deputies

The number of elected deputies is 630. However, due to resignations, deaths or office incompatibilities, the number of deputies might be lower during the periods in which substitutes are picked (via parties lists or via by-elections).
 President: Roberto Fico (M5S), elected on 24 March 2018
 Vice Presidents: Maria Edera Spadoni (M5S), Ettore Rosato (PD, then IV), Fabio Rampelli (FdI), Mara Carfagna (FI) (until 15 February 2021)

{| class="wikitable"
|+
|-
! colspan="4" |Initial composition
| rowspan="25" style="width : 1%;" |
! colspan="7" |Current composition
|-
! colspan="3" |Parliamentary group
!Seats
! colspan="3" |Parliamentary group
!Seats
!Change
!Notes
|-
| bgcolor="" width=1% |
| colspan = "2" | Five Star Movement
| 222
| bgcolor="" width=1% |
| colspan = "2" | Five Star Movement
| 96
|  126
| 
|-
| bgcolor="" width=1% |
| colspan = "2" | League – Salvini Premier
| 125
| bgcolor="" width=1% |
| colspan = "2" | League – Salvini Premier
| 131
|  6
| 
|-
| bgcolor="" width=1% |
| colspan = "2" | Democratic Party
| 111
| bgcolor="" width=1% |
| colspan = "2" | Democratic Party
| 97
|  14
| 
|-
| bgcolor="" width=1% |
| colspan = "2" | Forza Italia – Berlusconi for President
| 104
| bgcolor="" width=1% |
| colspan = "2" | Forza Italia – Berlusconi for President
| 68
|  36
| 
|-
| bgcolor="" width=1% |
| colspan = "2" | Brothers of Italy
| 32
| bgcolor="" width=1% |
| colspan = "2" | Brothers of Italy
| 40
|  8
| 
|-
| colspan="4" |
| bgcolor="" width=1% |
| colspan = "2" | Together for the Future – Civic Commitment
| 48
|  48
| 
|-
| colspan="4" |
| bgcolor="" width=1% |
| colspan = "2" | Italia Viva – Italia C'è
| 32
|  32
| 
|-
| colspan="4" |
| bgcolor="" width=1% |
| colspan = "2" | Free and Equal – Article One – Italian Left
| 10
|  10
| 
|-
| rowspan=13 bgcolor="" width=1% |
| colspan = "2" | Mixed
| 36
| rowspan=13 bgcolor="" width=1% |
| colspan = "2" | Mixed
| 107
|  71
| 
|-
| bgcolor="" width=1% |
| Linguistic Minorities
| align="right" |4
| bgcolor="" width=1% |
| Linguistic Minorities
| align="right" |4
| align="right" | 
|
|-
| bgcolor="" width=1% |
| Us with Italy
| align="right" |4
| bgcolor="" width=1% |
| Us with Italy – USEI – Renaissance – ADC
| align="right" |5
| align="right" |  1
| 
|-
| bgcolor="" width=1% |
| Free and Equal
| align="right" |14
| colspan="3" |
| align="right" |  14
|
|-
| colspan="3" |
| bgcolor="" width=1% |
| Alternativa
| align="right" |14
| align="right" |  14
| 
|-
| colspan="3" |
| bgcolor="" width=1% |
| Vinciamo Italia – Italy in the Centre with Toti
| align="right" |10
| align="right" |  10
| 
|-
| colspan="3" |
| bgcolor="" width=1% |
| Coraggio Italia
| align="right" |11
| align="right" |  11
| 
|-
| colspan="3" |
| bgcolor="" width=1% |
| Action – +Europe – Italian Radicals
| align="right" |6
| align="right" |  6
| 
|-
| colspan="3" |
| bgcolor="" width="1%" |
| MAIE – PSI – Facciamo Eco
| align="right" |5
| align="right" |  5
| 
|-
| colspan="3" |
| bgcolor="" width=1% |
| Democratic Centre
| align="right" |5| align="right" |  5| 
|-
| colspan="3" |
| bgcolor="" width=1% |
| Green Europe – European Greens| align="right" |5| align="right" |  5| 
|-
| colspan="3" |
| bgcolor="" width=1% |
|  – | align="right" |4| align="right" |  4| 
|-
| bgcolor="" width="1%" |
|Non inscrits| align="right" |14| bgcolor="" width="1%" |
|Non inscrits| align="right" |38| align="right" |  24| 
|-
! colspan="4" |
! colspan="6" |
|-
| colspan="3" |Total seats| 630
| colspan="3" |Total seats| 630
| 
|-
|}

Senate

In this legislature the number of elected Senators was 314, instead of the usual 315: in the Sicily constituency the total number of assigned seats to the M5S exceeded the number of candidates in the party's list. Including the six life senators, the total number of senators was therefore 320. On 31 July 2019, the Senate commission on elections finalized a decision about the missing seat in Sicily, assigning it to the M5S. The total number of senators is currently 321.
 President: Maria Elisabetta Alberti Casellati (FI), elected on 24 March 2018
 Vice Presidents: Roberto Calderoli (Lega), Ignazio La Russa (FdI), Paola Taverna (M5S), Anna Rossomando (PD)

Main legislative acts
 Dignity decree, approved on 7 August 2018. The bill imposed additional limits on the temporary employment contracts, issued fines on companies which received government aid and decide to relocate abroad, and banned advertising of gambling operators.
 Security decree, or Salvini decree, approved on 28 November 2018. Strongly pushed by then Interior Minister Matteo Salvini, the bill involves measures regarding public safety and immigration. The new legislation abolished the status of humanitarian protection, extended the period of immigration detention in the Italian identification centres, increased funding for repatriation, extended the list of crimes that imply a nullification of refugee or protection status, and introduced the possibility of canceling the Italian citizenship acquired by a foreigner citizen in case they committed a terrorism-related crime.
 Anti-corruption bill, also known as "Spazza-corrotti", approved on 18 December 2018. The bill increased the punishment and introduced a ban from public service for officers convicted for corruption, reformed the statute of limitations by expanding the time span for prescription, and included new rules for the regulation of political party funding.
 2019 budget law, approved on 30 December 2018. The bill introduced new taxes on web-based businesses and a strategy to drive up government revenues by selling public properties. The 2019 budget included a target deficit of 2.04% of the GDP, meeting the requests of the European Commission after a first proposal of 2.4%.
 Citizens' income and "quota 100" decree, approved on 27 March 2019. The bill introduced a means-tested "citizens' income" to support poor families of up to 780 euros per month for a single unemployed person, and up to 1032 euros per month for a family. The bill also lowered the age of retirement based on the "100 quota": workers can retire when the sum of their age and their pension contribution years adds up to 100.
 Right of self-defense decree, approved on 28 March 2019. The bill introduced limitations to legal action against persons who attack an intruder, legitimating the self-defense also in case of "perceived" threat.
 Economic growth decree, approved on 27 June 2019. After two consecutive quarters of negative national growth, the government passed a bill introducing various tax cuts and investment boosts.
 Security decree – bis, approved on 5 August 2019. The bill covers mainly two topics: migrant rescue at sea, and public order management during demonstrations. The bill allowed the Interior Minister to limit or forbid the passage of ships in national waters for security and public-order reasons, and issued sanctions up to 1 million euros and possibly the seizure of the vessel against the ship captains who violate this law. Regarding public order management, the bill introduces harsher punishments for the usage of rockets, petards, sticks, bats, and helmets during demonstrations, and for the interruption of a public service.
 Constitutional law – Reduction of the number of MPs, approved on 8 October 2019. The constitutional law reduces the size of the two houses of Parliament, from 630 to 400 in the Chamber of Deputies and from 315 to 200 in the Senate.
 Climate decree, approved on 10 December 2019. The bill is the first step of the government proposed "Green New Deal" plan; it introduced incentives for reducing the use of plastic packaging by shopkeepers, and incentives to car, moped or scooter drivers to use public transport in their cities.
 2020 budget law, approved on 24 December 2019. This budget law was the first of the Conte II cabinet, and introduced tax cuts and a crack-down on tax evasion. The budget keeps the Italian deficit for 2020 at 2.2% of the GDP, and introduced safeguard clauses in order to keep the 2021 deficit at 1.8%, like the previously planned target agreed with the European Commission.
 2021 budget law, approved on 23 December 2020. It introduced, among other things, new tax cuts and incentives to buy electric cars. The budget targets the fiscal deficit to fall to 7% of GDP in 2021.
 2022 budget law, approved on 30 December 2021. Among other things, it lowered the number of income tax bands from five to four, and replaced the "100 quota" with the "102 quota": workers can retire when the sum of their age and their pension contribution years adds up to 102 rather than to 100 like it was since 2019. The budget targets the fiscal deficit to fall to 5.6% of GDP in 2022.
 Constitutional law - Right to vote at age 18 in Senate elections, approved on 8 July 2021. This constitutional law modifies article 58 of the Italian Constitution, and lowers the minimum voting age for Senate elections from 25 to 18.

Legislation related to the COVID-19 pandemic

In order to counter the health, economic, and social effects of the COVID-19 pandemic, the Italian government enacted multiple legislative acts, usually of the type known as "decree of the President of the Council of ministers" or DPCM. Most of these decrees were later approved by both houses of Parliament.

 COVID decree, approved on 4 March 2020. This decree imposed a full lockdown in 10 comuni in Lombardy and one in Veneto; additionally, it imposed a partial lockdown in Lombardy, Veneto, Emilia-Romagna, and the provinces of Savona and Pesaro-Urbino.
 Cure Italy decree , approved on 24 April 2020. This decree introduced measures to support the national health service and to enhance financial aid to businesses, workers, and families that were hit by the pandemic. The government allocated 25 billion euros to fund these measures.
 Relaunch decree'', approved on 16 July 2020. This decree expanded and enhanced the measures taken in the previous "Cure Italy decree", with an allocated funding of additional 54.9 billion euros.

References

Legislatures of Italy
2018 establishments in Italy